The House of Councillors in the Japanese national Diet is made up of 245 members elected from 45 districts plus a national proportional representation list. Until 2015, there were 47 districts which coincided with the 47 prefectures of Japan.

In order to address the imbalance in voter representation between rural and urban voters, the Public Officers Election Law was amended in 2012 and again in 2015. The 2015 amendment sees the merger of the two smallest districts, Tottori and Shimane, to create a combined Tottori-Shimane at-large district, as well as the merger of Kochi and Tokushima districts (the third- and fourth-smallest districts) to create a combined Tokushima-Kōchi at-large district. Other changes to the number of Councilors have also been made to address the imbalance. Below is a table of districts, sortable by name, magnitude and voter disparity, based on the official number of registered voters as of September 2015.

List of districts

National PR block 
In addition to the smaller districts mentioned above, the House of Councillors also has a single block for the entire nation. It elects 50 members per election (100 in total) based on the D'Hondt method.

See also
List of districts of the House of Representatives of Japan

References

 
Japan
Districts of the House of Councillors of Japan